The Carson Challenger (also known as the USTA Player Development Classic and the USTA LA Tennis Open) was a tournament for professional female and male tennis players played on outdoor hard courts. The event was classified as a $50,000 ITF Women's Circuit tournament and was held in Carson, California, United States, from 2007–2011. In 2014 the tournament was a replacement for the Yakima Regional Hospital Challenger, as their clubhouse was destroyed by a fire earlier in the year. The event was also previously part of the ATP Challenger Tour series from 2005 to 2010, with the exception of 2006.

Past finals

Men's singles

Women's singles

Men's doubles

Women's doubles

References

External links 
 
 ITF search

Defunct tennis tournaments in the United States
ITF Women's World Tennis Tour
ATP Challenger Tour
Hard court tennis tournaments in the United States
Tennis tournaments in California
Sports competitions in Los Angeles County, California
Tennis in California
USTA LA Tennis Open
Recurring sporting events established in 2005
Recurring sporting events disestablished in 2014